This is a list of French television related events from 1995.

Events

Debuts

International
12 February -  Aladdin (1994-1995) (TF1)

Television shows

1940s
Le Jour du Seigneur (1949–present)

1950s
Présence protestante (1955-)

1970s
30 millions d'amis (1976-2016)

1980s
Dimanche Martin

Births

Deaths

See also
1995 in France
List of French films of 1995

References